Mīmāṁsā (Sanskrit: मीमांसा) is a Sanskrit word that means "reflection" or "critical investigation" and thus refers to a tradition of contemplation which reflected on the meanings of certain Vedic texts. This tradition is also known as Pūrva-Mīmāṁsā because of its focus on the earlier (pūrva) Vedic texts dealing with ritual actions, and similarly as Karma-Mīmāṁsā due to its focus on ritual action (karma). It is one of six Vedic "affirming" (āstika) schools of Hinduism. This particular school is known for its philosophical theories on the nature of dharma, based on hermeneutics of the Vedas, especially the Brāḥmanas and Saṃhitas. The Mīmāṃsā school was foundational and influential for the vedāntic schools, which were also known as Uttara-Mīmāṁsā for their focus on the "later" (uttara) portions of the Vedas, the Upaniṣads. While both "earlier" and "later" Mīmāṃsā investigate the aim of human action, they do so with different attitudes towards the necessity of ritual praxis.

Mīmāṁsā has several sub-schools, each defined by its epistemology. The Prabhākara sub-school, which takes its name from the seventh-century philosopher Prabhākara, described the five epistemically reliable means to gaining knowledge: pratyakṣa or perception; anumāna or inference; upamāṇa, by comparison and analogy; arthāpatti, the use of postulation and derivation from circumstances; and śabda, the word or testimony of past or present reliable experts. The Bhāṭṭa sub-school, from philosopher Kumārila Bhaṭṭa, added a sixth means to its canon; anupalabdhi meant non-perception, or proof by the absence of cognition (e.g., the lack of gunpowder on a suspect's hand)

The school of Mīmāṃsā consists of both atheistic and theistic doctrines, but the school showed little interest in systematic examination of the existence of Gods. Rather, it held that the soul is an eternal, omnipresent, inherently active spiritual essence, and focused on the epistemology and metaphysics of dharma. For the Mīmāṃsā school,  dharma meant rituals and social duties, not devas, or gods, because gods existed only in name. The Mīmāṃsakas also held that Vedas are "eternal, author-less, [and] infallible", that Vedic vidhi, or injunctions and mantras in rituals are prescriptive kārya or actions, and the rituals are of primary importance and merit. They considered the Upaniṣads and other texts related to self-knowledge and spirituality as subsidiary, a philosophical view that Vedānta disagreed with.

 While their deep analysis of language and linguistics influenced other schools of Hinduism, their views were not shared by others. Mīmāṃsakas considered the purpose and power of language was to clearly prescribe the proper, correct and right. In contrast, Vedāntins extended the scope and value of language as a tool to also describe, develop and derive. Mīmāṁsakās considered orderly, law driven, procedural life as central purpose and noblest necessity of dharma and society, and divine (theistic) sustenance means to that end.

The Mīmāṁsā school is a form of philosophical realism. A key text of the Mīmāṁsā school is the Mīmāṁsā Sūtra of Jaimini.

Terminology
Mīmāṃsā, also romanized Mimansa or Mimamsa, means "reflection, consideration, profound thought, investigation, examination, discussion" in Sanskrit. This division is based on classification of the Vedic texts into , the early sections of the Veda treating of mantras and rituals (Samhitas and Brahmanas), and the  dealing with the meditation, reflection and knowledge of Self, Oneness, Brahman (the Upaniṣads). Between the Samhitas and Brahmanas, the Mīmāṃsā school places greater emphasis to the Brahmanas - the part of Vedas that is a commentary on Vedic rituals.

The word comes from the desiderative stem of √man (Macdonell, A. A, 1883, A Sanskrit-English Dictionary), from Proto-Indo-European *men- (“to think”). Donald Davis translates Mīmāṃsā as the "desire to think", and in colloquial historical context as "how to think and interpret things". In the last centuries of the first millennium BCE, the word Mīmāṃsā began to denote the thoughts on and interpretation of the Vedas, first as Pūrva-Mīmāṃsā for rituals portions in the earlier layers of texts in the Vedas, and as Uttara-Mīmāṃsā for the philosophical portions in the last layers. Over time, Pūrva-Mīmāṃsā was just known as the Mīmāṃsā school, and the Uttara-Mīmāṃsā as the Vedanta school.

Mīmāṃsā scholars are referred to as Mīmāṃsākas.

Darśana (philosophy) – central concerns

Mīmānsā is one of the six classical Hindu darśanas. It is among the earliest schools of Hindu philosophies. It has attracted relatively less scholarly study, although its theories and particularly its questions on exegesis and theology have been highly influential on all classical Indian philosophies. Its analysis of language has been of central importance to the legal literature of India.

Ancient Mīmānsā's central concern was epistemology (pramana), that is what are the reliable means to knowledge. It debated not only "how does man ever learn or know, whatever he knows", but also whether the nature of all knowledge is inherently circular, whether those such as foundationalists who critique the validity of any "justified beliefs" and knowledge system make flawed presumptions of the very premises they critique, and how to correctly interpret and avoid incorrectly interpreting dharma texts such as the Vedas. It asked questions such as "what is devata (god)?", "are rituals dedicated to devatas efficacious?", "what makes anything efficacious?", and "can it be proved that the Vedas, or any canonical text in any system of thought, fallible or infallible (svatah pramanya, intrinsically valid)?, if so, how?" and others. To Mīmānsā scholars, the nature of non-empirical knowledge and human means to it are such that one can never demonstrate certainty, one can only falsify knowledge claims, in some cases. According to Francis Clooney, a professor at Harvard Divinity School specializing on Hinduism, the Mīmānsā school is "one of the most distinctively Hindu forms of thinking; it is without real parallel elsewhere in the world".

The central text of the Mīmānsā school is Jamini's Mīmānsā Sutras, along with the historically influential commentaries on this sutra by Sabara and by Kumarila Bhatta. Together, these texts develop and apply the rules of language analysis (such as the rules of contradiction), asserting that one must not only examine injunctive propositions in any scripture, but also examine the alternate related or reverse propositions for better understanding. They suggested that to reach correct and valid knowledge it is not only sufficient to demand proof of a proposition, it is important to give proof of a proposition's negative as well as declare and prove one's own preferred propositions. Further, they asserted that whenever perception is not the means of direct proof and knowledge, one cannot prove such non-empirical propositions to be "true or not true", rather one can only prove a non-empirical proposition is "false, not false, or uncertain".

For example, Mīmānsākas welcome not only the demand for proof of an injunctive proposition such as "agnihotra ritual leads one to heaven", but suggest that one must examine and prove alternate propositions such as "ritual does not lead one to heaven",  "something else leads one to heaven", "there is heaven", "there is no heaven" and so on. Mīmānsā literature states that if satisfactory, verifiable proof for all of such propositions cannot be found by its proponents and its opponents, then the proposition needs to be accepted as a part of a "belief system". Beliefs, such as those in the scriptures (Vedas), must be accepted to be true unless its opponents can demonstrate the proof of validity of their own texts or teacher(s) these opponents presume to be prima facie justified, and until these opponents can demonstrate that the scriptures they challenge are false. If they do not try to do so, it is hypocrisy; if they try to do so, it can only lead to infinite regress, according to Mīmānsākas. Any historic scripture with widespread social acceptance, according to Mīmānsāka, is an activity of communication (vyavaharapravrtti) and is accepted as authoritative because it is socially validated practice, unless perceptually verifiable evidence emerges that proves parts or all of it as false or harmful.

Mīmānsākas were predominantly concerned with the central motivation of human beings, the highest good, and actions that make this possible. They stated that human beings seek niratisaya priti (unending ecstatic pleasure, joy, happiness) in this life and the next. They argued that this highest good is the result of one's own ethical actions (dharma), that such actions are what the Vedic sentences contain and communicate, and therefore it important to properly interpret and understand Vedic sentences, words and meaning. Mīmānsā scholarship was centrally concerned with the philosophy of language, how human beings learn and communicate with each other and across generations with language in order to act in a manner that enables them to achieve that which motivates them. The Mīmānsā school focussed on dharma, deriving ethics and activity from the karma-kanda (rituals) part of the Vedas, with the argument that ethics for this life and efficacious action for svarga (heaven) cannot be derived from sense-perception, and can only be derived from experience, reflection and understanding of past teachings.

In every human activity, the motivating force to perform an action is his innate longing for priti (pleasure, happiness),
whether at the lowest level or the highest level.
At the highest level, it is nothing but an unsurpassed state of priti,
which is ensured only by performing ethical actions.
– Sabara, 2nd century Mīmānsā scholar

According to Daniel Arnold, Mīmānsā scholarship has "striking affinities" with that of William Alston, the 20th century Western philosopher, along with some notable differences. The Mīmānsākas subjected to a radical critique, more than two thousand years ago, states Francis Clooney, the notions such as "God," the "sacred text," the "author" and the "anthropocentric ordering of reality".

Epistemology
In the field of epistemology, later Mīmāṃsākas made some notable contributions. Unlike the Nyaya or the Vaisheshika systems, the  sub-school of Mīmāṃsā recognizes five means of valid knowledge (Skt. pramāṇa). The  sub-school of Mīmāṃsā recognizes one additional sixth, namely anuapalabdhi, just like Advaita Vedanta school of Hinduism. These six epistemically reliable means of gaining knowledge are:

Pratyaksa
Main article : Pratyaksha

Pratyakṣa (प्रत्यक्ष means perception. It is of two types in Mīmānsā and other schools of Hinduism: external and internal. External perception is described as that arising from the interaction of five senses and worldly objects, while internal perception is described by this school as that of inner sense, the mind. The ancient and medieval Indian texts identify four requirements for correct perception: Indriyarthasannikarsa (direct experience by one's sensory organ(s) with the object, whatever is being studied), Avyapadesya (non-verbal; correct perception is not through hearsay, according to ancient Indian scholars, where one's sensory organ relies on accepting or rejecting someone else's perception), Avyabhicara (does not wander; correct perception does not change, nor is it the result of deception because one's sensory organ or means of observation is drifting, defective, suspect) and Vyavasayatmaka (definite; correct perception excludes judgments of doubt, either because of one's failure to observe all the details, or because one is mixing inference with observation and observing what one wants to observe, or not observing what one does not want to observe). Some ancient scholars proposed "unusual perception" as pramana and called it internal perception, a proposal contested by other Indian scholars. The internal perception concepts included pratibha (intuition), samanyalaksanapratyaksa (a form of induction from perceived specifics to a universal), and jnanalaksanapratyaksa (a form of perception of prior processes and previous states of a 'topic of study' by observing its current state). Further, some schools of Hinduism considered and refined rules of accepting uncertain knowledge from Pratyakṣa-pramana, so as to contrast nirnaya (definite judgment, conclusion) from anadhyavasaya (indefinite judgment).

Anumana
Main article : Anumana

Anumāṇa (अनुमान) means inference. It is described as reaching a new conclusion and truth from one or more observations and previous truths by applying reason. Observing smoke and inferring fire is an example of Anumana. In all except one Hindu philosophies, this is a valid and useful means to knowledge. The method of inference is explained by Indian texts as consisting of three parts: pratijna (hypothesis), hetu (a reason), and drshtanta (examples). The hypothesis must further be broken down into two parts, state the ancient Indian scholars: sadhya (that idea which needs to proven or disproven) and paksha (the object on which the sadhya is predicated). The inference is conditionally true if sapaksha (positive examples as evidence) are present, and if vipaksha (negative examples as counter-evidence) are absent. For rigor, the Indian philosophies also state further epistemic steps. For example, they demand Vyapti - the requirement that the hetu (reason) must necessarily and separately account for the inference in "all" cases, in both sapaksha and vipaksha. A conditionally proven hypothesis is called a nigamana (conclusion).

Upamana
Main article : Upamāṇa

Upamāṇa means comparison and analogy. Some Hindu schools consider it as a proper means of knowledge. Upamana, states Lochtefeld, may be explained with the example of a traveller who has never visited lands or islands with endemic population of wildlife. He or she is told, by someone who has been there, that in those lands you see an animal that sort of looks like a cow, grazes like a cow, but is different from a cow in such and such way. Such use of analogy and comparison is, state the Indian epistemologists, a valid means of conditional knowledge, as it helps the traveller identify the new animal later. The subject of comparison is formally called upameyam, the object of comparison is called upamanam, while the attribute(s) are identified as samanya. Thus, explains Monier Monier-Williams, if a boy says "her face is like the moon in charmingness", "her face" is upameyam, the moon is upamanam, and charmingness is samanya. The  7th century text Bhaṭṭikāvya in verses 10.28 through 10.63 discusses many types of comparisons and analogies, identifying when this epistemic method is more useful and reliable, and when it is not. In various ancient and medieval texts of Hinduism, 32 types of Upanama and their value in epistemology are debated.

Arthāpatti

Arthāpatti (अर्थापत्ति) means postulation, derivation from circumstances. In contemporary logic, this pramāṇa is similar to circumstantial implication. As example, if a person left in a boat on a river earlier, and the time is now past the expected time of arrival, then the circumstances support the truth postulate that the person has arrived. Many Indian scholars considered this pramāṇa as invalid or at best weak, because the boat may have gotten delayed or diverted. However, in cases such as deriving the time of a future sunrise or sunset, this method was asserted by the proponents to be reliable. Another common example for arthāpatti found in the texts of Mīmāṃsā  and other schools of Hinduism is, that if "Devadatta is fat" and "Devadatta does not eat in the day", then the following must be true: "Devadatta eats in the night". This form of postulation and deriving from circumstances is, claim the Indian scholars, a means to discovery, proper insight and knowledge. The Hindu schools that accept this means of knowledge state that this method is a valid means to conditional knowledge and truths about a subject and object in original premises or different premises. The schools that do not accept this method, state that postulation, extrapolation and circumstantial implication is either derivable from other pramāṇas or flawed means to correct knowledge, instead one must rely on direct perception or proper inference.

Anupalabdhi
Main article : Anupalabdhi, See also: Abhava

Anupalabdi (अनुपलब्धि), accepted only by Kumarila Bhatta sub-school of Mīmāṃsā, means non-perception, negative/cognitive proof. Anupalabdhi pramana suggests that knowing a negative, such as "there is no jug in this room" is a form of valid knowledge. If something can be observed or inferred or proven as non-existent or impossible, then one knows more than what one did without such means. In the two schools of Hinduism that consider Anupalabdhi as epistemically valuable, a valid conclusion is either sadrupa (positive) or asadrupa (negative) relation - both correct and valuable. Like other pramana, Indian scholars refined Anupalabdi to four types: non-perception of the cause, non-perception of the effect, non-perception of object, and non-perception of contradiction. Only two schools of Hinduism accepted and developed the concept "non-perception" as a pramana. The schools that endorsed Anupalabdi affirmed that it as valid and useful when the other five pramanas fail in one's pursuit of knowledge and truth.

Abhava (अभाव) means non-existence. Some scholars consider Anupalabdi to be same as Abhava, while others consider Anupalabdi and Abhava as different. Abhava-pramana has been discussed in ancient Hindu texts in the context of Padārtha (पदार्थ, referent of a term). A Padartha is defined as that which is simultaneously Astitva (existent), Jneyatva (knowable) and Abhidheyatva (nameable). Specific examples of padartha, states Bartley, include dravya (substance), guna (quality), karma (activity/motion), samanya/jati (universal/class property), samavaya (inherence) and vishesha (individuality). Abhava is then explained as "referents of negative expression" in contrast to "referents of positive expression" in Padartha. An absence, state the ancient scholars, is also "existent, knowable and nameable", giving the example of negative numbers, silence as a form of testimony, asatkaryavada theory of causation, and analysis of deficit as real and valuable. Abhava was further refined in four types, by the schools of Hinduism that accepted it as a useful method of epistemology: dhvamsa (termination of what existed), atyanta-abhava (impossibility, absolute non-existence, contradiction), anyonya-abhava (mutual negation, reciprocal absence) and pragavasa (prior, antecedent non-existence).

Sabda

Śabda (शब्द) means relying on word, testimony of past or present reliable experts. Hiriyanna explains Sabda-pramana as a concept which means reliable expert testimony. The schools of Hinduism which consider it epistemically valid suggest that a human being needs to know numerous facts, and with the limited time and energy available, he can learn only a fraction of those facts and truths directly.  He must rely on others, his parent, family, friends, teachers, ancestors and kindred members of society to rapidly acquire and share knowledge and thereby enrich each other's lives. This means of gaining proper knowledge is either spoken or written, but through Sabda (words). The reliability of the source is important, and legitimate knowledge can only come from the Sabda of reliable sources. The disagreement between the schools of Hinduism has been on how to establish reliability. Some schools, such as Carvaka, state that this is never possible, and therefore Sabda is not a proper pramana. Other schools debate means to establish reliability.

Relation to Vedanta school
An interesting feature of the Mīmāṃsā school of philosophy is its unique epistemological theory of the intrinsic validity of all cognition as such. It is held that all knowledge is ipso facto true (Skt. svataḥ prāmāṇyavāda). Thus, what is to be proven is not the truth of a cognition, but its falsity. The Mīmāṃsākas advocate the self-validity of knowledge both in respect of its origin (utpatti) and ascertainment (jñapti). Not only did the Mīmāṃsākas make a very great use of this theory to establish the unchallengeable validity of the Vedas, but later Vedantists also drew freely upon this particular Mīmāṃsā contribution.

Metaphysics and beliefs
The central aim of the school is elucidation of the nature of dharma, understood as a set ritual obligations and prerogatives to be performed properly.

Atheism
Mīmāṃsā theorists decided that the evidence allegedly proving the existence of God was insufficient. They argue that there was no need to postulate a maker for the world, just as there was no need for an author to compose the Vedas or a God to validate the rituals. Mīmāṃsā argues that the Gods named in the Vedas have no existence apart from the mantras that speak their names. To that regard, the power of the mantras is what is seen as the power of Gods.

Dharma
Dharma as understood by Pūrva Mīmāṃsā can be loosely translated into English as "virtue", "morality" or "duty". The Pūrva Mīmāṃsā school traces the source of the knowledge of dharma neither to sense-experience nor inference, but to verbal cognition (i.e. knowledge of words and meanings) according to Vedas. In this respect it is related to the Nyāya school, the latter, however, accepts only four sources of knowledge (pramāṇa) as valid.

The Pūrva Mīmāṃsā school held dharma to be equivalent to following the prescriptions of the Saṃhitās and their Brāhmaṇa commentaries relating the correct performance of Vedic rituals. Seen in this light, Pūrva Mīmāṃsā is essentially ritualist (orthopraxy), placing great weight on the performance of karma or action as enjoined by the Vedas.

Relation to Vedānta
Emphasis of Yajnic Karmakāṇḍas in Pūrva Mīmāṃsā is erroneously interpreted by some to be an opposition to Jñānakāṇḍa of Vedānta and Upaniṣads. Pūrva Mīmāṃsā does not discuss topics related to Jñānakāṇḍa, such as salvation (mokṣa), but it never speaks against mokṣa. Vedānta quotes Jaimini's belief in Brahman as well as in mokṣa:

In Uttara-Mīmāṃsā or Vedānta (4.4.5-7), Bāḍarāyaṇa cites Jaimini as saying (ब्राह्मेण जैमिनिरूपन्यासादिभ्यः) "(The mukta Puruṣa is united with the Brahman) as if it were like the Brahman, because descriptions (in Śruti etc) prove so".

In Vedānta (1.2.28), Bāḍarāyaṇa cites Jaimini as saying that "There is no contradiction in taking Vaishvānara as the supreme Brahman".

In 1.2.31, Jaimini is again quoted by Bāḍarāyana as saying that the nirguna (attribute-less) Brahman can manifest itself as having a form.

In 4.3.12, Bādarāyana again cites Jaimini as saying that the mukta Purusha attains Brahman.

In Pūrva Mīmāṃsā too, Jaimini emphasises the importance of faith in and attachment to the Omnipotent Supreme Being Whom Jaimini calls "The Omnipotent Pradhaana" (The Main):

Pūrva Mīmāṃsā 6.3.1: "sarvaśaktau pravṛttiḥ syāt tathābhūtopadeśāt" (सर्वशक्तौ प्रवृत्तिः स्यात् तथाभूतोपदेशात्). The term upadeśa here means instructions of the śāstras as taught. We should tend towards the omnipotent supreme being. In the context of Pūrva Mīmāṃsā 6.3.1 shown above, next two sutras becomes significant, in which this Omnipotent Being is termed as "pradhāna", and keeping away from Him is said to be a "doṣa", hence all beings are asked to get related ("abhisambandhāt" in  tadakarmaṇi ca doṣas tasmāt tato viśeṣaḥ syāt pradhānenābhisambandhāt; Jaimini 6, 3.3) to the "Omnipotent Main Being" (api vāpy ekadeśe syāt pradhāne hy arthanirvṛttir guṇamātram itarat tadarthatvāt; Jaimini 6, 3.2). Karma-Mīmāṃsā supports the Vedas, and Rgveda says that one Truth is variously named by the sages. It is irrelevant whether we call Him as Pradhāna or Brahman or Vaishvānara or Shiva or God.

History
The school's origins lie in the scholarly traditions of the final centuries BCE, when the priestly ritualism of Vedic sacrifice was being marginalized by Buddhism and Yoga. To counteract this challenge, several groups emerged dedicated to demonstrating the validity of the Vedic texts by rigid formulation of rules for their interpretation.

The school for some time in the Early Middle Ages exerted near-dominant influence on learned Hindu thought, and is credited as a major force contributing to the decline of Buddhism in India, but it has fallen into decline in the High Middle Ages and  today is all but eclipsed by Vedanta.

Mīmāṃsā texts
The foundational text for the Mīmāṃsā school is the Purva Mīmāṃsā Sutras of Jaimini (ca. 5th to 4th century BCE). A major commentary was composed by Śābara in ca. the 5th or 6th century CE.
Kumārila Bhaṭṭa, Mandana Miśra, Pārthasārathi Miśra, Sucarita Miśra, Ramakrishna Bhatta, Madhava Subhodini, Sankara Bhatta, Krsnayajvan, Anantadeva, Gaga Bhatta, Ragavendra Tirtha, VijayIndhra Tirtha, Appayya Dikshitar, Paruthiyur Krishna Sastri, Mahomahapadyaya Sri Ramsubba Sastri, Sri Venkatsubba Sastri, Sri A. Chinnaswami Sastri, Sengalipuram Vaidhyanatha Dikshitar were some of Mīmānsā scholars.

The text has 12 chapters, of which the first chapter is of philosophical value.

See also

Cārvāka
Vaisheshika
Samkhya
Yoga
Nyaya
Vedanta
Śālikanātha
Mimamsa - IISER Pune

References

Bibliography

Further reading

 Reprint edition; Originally published under the title of The Six Systems of Indian Philosophy.

 Bollingen Series XXVI; Edited by Joseph Campbell.

External links

The Mimamsa Sutras of Jaimini
Introduction to Purva-Mimamsa G. Jha (Translator), Asiatic Society of Bengal
Complete Lectures on Purva Mimamsa Sutras of Jaimini at ShastraNethralaya
S. Srikanta Sastri, "The Logical system of Madhvacharya " Published in Poona Oriental Series, No. 75 - "A Volume of Studies in Indology", presented to P. V. Kane on his 60th birthday 
 

Hindu philosophical concepts
Hermeneutics
Ritual
Schools and traditions in ancient Indian philosophy
Āstika